Olave Mandara is a 2011 Indian Kannada road movie written and directed by Jayatheertha, and starring debutantes Srikanth and Aakanksha Mansukhani in the lead roles. The supporting cast features  Rangayana Raghu, Veena Sundar, Nassar and Sadhu Kokila.

The sub-plot of the film is inspired by real-life events of Dashrath Manjhi, who cut a rocky hill for 22 years to build a road in memory of his wife.

Srikant was adjudged as the 'Promising Newcomer (Male)' for his performance in the film, based on an online poll conducted by The Times of India.

Plot
Srikanth (Srikanth), a son of a rich industrialist (Nassar), meets Preeti (Aakanksha Mansukhani), an Assamese girl, in a dance competition in Coimbatore, and falls in love with her. His initial intentions were to only steal a few kisses from her. Bound by guilt, he sets off on foot to Assam to meet her as promised. On his journey, he faces the realities of life as he meets various characters and witnessing incidents such as a farmer couple sharing their lunch with a 'kind' thief (Sadhu Kokila), and a cobbler (Rangayana Raghu), taking his disabled wife (Veena Sundar) on a pilgrimage to Kashi on a bullock-cart. Srikanth is moved on witnessing these. The film ends with Srikanth and Preeti reuniting.

Cast

 Srikanth as Srikanth
 Aakanksha Mansukhani as Preeti
 Sharan as Sandy
 Rangayana Raghu as Ratna
 Veena Sundar as Nanji
 Sadhu Kokila
 Nassar
 Surya
 Sanketh Kashi
 Dharmavaram Subramanya
 Honnavalli Krishna
 Ashok Jambe
 Ramachandra Prathihari
 Pranayamurthy
 Pradeep Varma
 Shailaja
 Prof. Ramdas
 Amrutha Gowda
 Archana
 Dr. Chikkahejjaji Mahadev
 Jayalakshmi

Soundtrack

Deva scored the film's background music and composed for its soundtrack, with its lyrics written by Kaviraj, K. Kalyan, K. V. Raju, Hamsalekha and Jayatheertha. The lyrics of the track "Onde Kerili" was taken from a poem of G. P. Rajarathnam. The soundtrack album consists of nine tracks. It was released in December 2010.

Reception

Critical response 

A critic from The Times of India scored the film at 4 out of 5 stars and says "While Srikanth impresses with a lively performance, Akanksha is amazing, with good expressions and a pleasant smile. The Rangayana Raghu-Veena Sundar duo moves one to tears. Nazer, Sharan and Sadhu Kokila have done justice to their roles". Satish Shile from Deccan Herald wrote "Srikanth is impressive in his debut. Rangayana Raghu’s performance is remarkable. Deva’s score is soothing. Jayatirtha deserves appreciation for doing justice to one of G P Rajarathnam’s popular songs and conceptualising a song with the theme of conserving greenery. A watchable movie". A critic from Bangalore Mirror wrote  "The dialogues are average, and could have been crisp. Srikanth does justice to the money his producer-father has poured for the film. Besides critical acclaim, Olave Mandara has all the potential for making it big at the box office. Go for an enthralling journey".

Awards and nominations

2011 Bangalore Times Film Awards
 Promising Newcomer (Male) – Srikanth

1st SIIMA Awards
 Best Male Debutant (Kannada) – Srikanth
 Best Female Debutant (Kannada) – Aakanksha Mansukhani

References

Films set in Bangalore
2011 films
2010s Kannada-language films
Indian road movies
2010s road movies
Films scored by Deva (composer)
Non-Assamese-language films with Assamese connection
Films set in Tamil Nadu
Films directed by Jayatheertha